Critical Energy Infrastructure Information (CEII) is specific engineering information such as plant schematics, information transfer ports, or detailed design information about proposed or existing critical infrastructure (physical or virtual) that meets these criteria:

Relates details about the production, generation, transmission, or distribution of energy
Could be useful to a person planning an attack on critical infrastructure
Is exempt from mandatory disclosure under the Freedom of Information Act, and
Gives strategic information beyond the location of the critical infrastructure

See also
 Sensitive But Unclassified information
 Classified information in the United States

External links
 CEII Freedom of Information Act Guidelines
 CEII Regulations

Energy infrastructure